Jacob Max Bezzant is a former political candidate for the New Zealand National Party and a former CEO of Parking Sense. 

Bezzant was appointed USA and Europe CEO of Parking Sense at age 26 and global CEO at age 28. Bezzant resigned from the National Party and from his roles as chair and director of the startup company Invisible Urban Charging in mid-2021 over allegations that he used images of his former partner on the internet to impersonate her.

Early life and career
Bezzant was born in Cambridge in 1987 or 1988. He attended Cambridge High School and the University of Waikato. According to a National Party profile, he studied law and politics/international relations, worked for Smart Parking Limited as a commercial manager and legal officer, and later became the chief executive officer of Parking Sense, a New Zealand technology company that provided parking solutions for cities, hospitals and airports.

Parking Sense
Bezzant stated that he was co-founder of the company Parking Sense and told a magazine that the company “grew from the lounge of my university flat”, but company records for its incorporation do not list him as a founding director or shareholder, and Paul Collins, another person associated with the company, said that Bezzant joined the company six months after it was founded and was not involved while he was at university. A BusinessDesk article said that Bezzant had to leave his job as CEO at Parking Sense "after disagreements over multi-million dollar contracts and 'fantasy' projects, including a Texas development now mired in bankruptcy and fraud allegations". Bezzant was not involved in the fraud claims. Parking Sense did confirm Bezzant was removed as CEO due to the disagreements. An article in The Spinoff commenting on the BusinessDesk report said, "There's a lot of he said, he said about whether or not Bezzant has been entirely accurate. National Party president Peter Goodfellow said the party "accepts Jake's position about his time at Parking Sense."

Other business interests
As of 2020, Bezzant was a 42% shareholder of Invisible Urban Charging, an electric vehicle charging-as-a-service company, which raised money in 2021 using PledgeMe.

Political career
In November 2019 Bezzant sought to be the National Party candidate in the  electorate after incumbent National MP Jami-Lee Ross became an independent MP, but National instead gave the candidacy to former Air New Zealand chief executive Christopher Luxon.

A month later, Bezzant was selected as the National Party candidate for the Upper Harbour electorate, following Paula Bennett's decision to become a list MP. At the 2020 general election, like many National MPs and candidates, Bezzant lost his electorate. While Bennett had a 9,000-vote majority, Bezzant lost to Labour's Vanushi Walters by 2,392 votes (Bezzant received 38% of the electorate vote compared to Walters' 44%).

Bezzant resigned from the National Party in 2021.

Misconduct allegations
On 31 May 2021, Bezzant's former partner began a podcast called Whips, Chains and Brains and in its first episode alleged that Bezzant had used intimate photos of her on the internet to impersonate her and to engage in online sex with other men. While the police investigated the matter, they determined a crime had not been committed. Bezzant's former partner alleged that he had taunted her over the police's decision. Bezzant told one news outlet that the allegations were untrue, and said in a statement that "Personal relationship break ups sometimes get messy. Two sides to every story. There is more than just her and I involved so I am going to respect that and so I am not going to discuss it." On 3 June 2021, another former partner alleged that Bezzant had also created a Snapchat account using her name, and was using this account to trick men into sending nude images. 

Bezzant resigned from the National Party; this was announced on 2 June 2021. The National Party stated that day that “we looked into the matter, and Mr Bezzant is no longer a member of the National Party.” Judith Collins, the party's leader, said that she became aware of the allegations in the evening of 1 June. She labelled Bezzant a "fantasist" and "possible sociopath" and suggested that the National Party needs to overhaul their candidate selection process.

The allegations led to Prime Minister Jacinda Ardern saying that her government will see if the law needs to be changed to cover similar incidents.

Personal life
Bezzant has played cricket for the Hamilton Old Boys Cricket Club, Hamilton, Ilkley, MCC, and Yorkshire Gentleman. According to a National party profile, Bezzant was involved with the Waikato Valley and Hamilton Cricket's Kiwi Cricket Coaching in Schools programme, Hamilton Cricket coaching in Schools and was president of the Hamilton Old Boys Cricket Club, and was involved in England and Wales Cricket Board Coaching.

References

1980s births
Living people
People from Cambridge, New Zealand
People educated at Cambridge High School, New Zealand
University of Waikato alumni
New Zealand National Party politicians
Unsuccessful candidates in the 2020 New Zealand general election
New Zealand chief executives